South Point Lighthouse is a lighthouse located in the south of Barbados.

History
It is the oldest lighthouse in Barbados. It was brought to Barbados in 1852, one year after being shown at London's Great Exhibition, and reassembled on the southernmost point of the island.  Although still listed as active, the lighthouse is now considered to be more of a national landmark and tourist attraction, with its grounds (but not tower) being made open to the public. The lighthouse has been depicted on the reverse of the 5 cent coin of the Barbadian coinage since 1973.

See also
 List of lighthouses in Barbados

References 

Lighthouses completed in 1852
Christ Church, Barbados
Lighthouses in Barbados
1852 establishments in Barbados